is a series of fantasy novels by Noriko Ogiwara, published by Chuokoron-Shinsha.

The series has been adapted into both a manga series and a thirteen episode anime television series subtitled Astraea Testament broadcast in Japan in 2006. The story revolves around a fifteen-year-old commoner who discovers that she is really a princess. The manga and novels were licensed for English language releases in North America by Tokyopop. After Tokyopop went out of business JManga began translating the manga and has progressed farther than TokyoPop did.

Plot 
Firiel Dee is given her mother's necklace by her childhood friend, Rumpelstiltskin (Roux). The necklace was meant as a birthday gift from her remote father, the astrologer Gideon Dee. All fifteen-year-olds are welcome to attend a public ball at the royal Roland castle in honor of the Queen's Birthday, and Firiel decides to wear her new necklace to the celebration. When it is recognized as a missing talisman of the royal family, this leads to the revelation that Firiel is the daughter of royalty and automatically in competition to become the next Queen.

Characters 

The main protagonist, Firiel is taken care of by Mr. and Mrs. Holy because her father never leaves the tower, the lab in which he and Rune study. She becomes recognized as one of the candidates for the Queen's position and finds out her mother was a famed member of the royal family.

Firiel's childhood friend as well as her father's student and assistant. He protects Firiel throughout the series and is obviously enamored by her. In the start of the series, Firiel looks at him more like a little brother, though they later develop a serious relationship. His past is troubled and shrouded in darkness as he later tells Firiel that he cannot be with her for that reason because to him she "shines like the sun itself". In the anime, they both end up returning home as a couple. Adale writes that Firiel, as a candidate, was the one who chose the most happiest life, because she lives in the place she loves with the person she loves.

A candidate for the Queen's position and a princess of the Roland family who becomes one of Firiel's friends. She is a fantasy author whose stories often include yaoi pairings inspired by Roux and her brother Eusis.
Leandra Cheviat

Leandra is a candidate for the Queen's position and a princess of the Cheviat family. She is also the headmistress of a school for girls so that she can maintain her high status and reputation. She is the archnemisis of both Firiel and Adel, as she sees them as threats to herself and her position. She tries to seduce and blackmail Roux, but is unsuccessful. Though she may seem like a bad person, she is in fact loyal to her country.
Ravenna

Firiel meets Ravenna at the school for privileged girls. Ravenna is the leader of the group that controls the school. She is Leandra's right-hand man. She is one of the best sword fighters in the school.
Ingraine

Ingraine attends the same school as Firiel, where her sword fighting skills are rivaled only by Ravenna's. She agrees to train Firiel for her duel with Ravenna to avenge her friend Roselitte, who she believes was killed by one of the girls in Ravenna's faction. Later in the series, she is seen fighting dragons side by side with Eusis, for whom she has developed a romantic attachment.

Firiel's father is a scientist and researcher who took Roux in as a student. Firiel thinks that he cares more about his Roux than her. It is revealed that he helped Duchess Edilin escape from the palace and married her.

Mrs. Holy takes care of Firiel before she lives in the palace; she appears throughout the series and helps Firiel.
 

Mr. Holy took care of Firiel along with his wife. He dies trying to save Firiel and Roux from members of the Snake Rod.
Marie

Marie is Firiel's friend from the village who often calls her "fairy girl" because of Firiel's fanciful nature. She becomes close friends with Adel as they both try to persuade Firiel to marry Eusis.

Eusis is Adel's older brother, who also protects Firiel in the series.  Eusis is considered to be Roux's rival for Firiel's affection. He proposes to Firiel on several occasions and eventually is rejected.

Eusis's close friend. He often teases Eusis about his growing feelings for Firiel. He is cunning and manipulative.
Bard

A mysterious minstrel with magical powers and close guardian to the queen of Gulair.

Edilin is Firiel's mother. She was a duchess of high standing in the royal court and a candidate to become the next queen of Astrea. She disappeared along with her touchstone, a very valuable neckless now in Firiel's possession. Adel and Eusis recognize the necklace from a picture on the wall of their father's study. She is seen in flashback to have been very similar to Firel - a smart, somewhat rebellious young woman who was willing to throw away everything for love. After running away, she changed her name to Yuna (a feminine alter-name for Astrea which means "my one and only").

Media

Novel 
There are eight novels out for Nishi no Yoki Majo released from September 25, 1997 to May 25, 2003. The last three novels are side stories. The series was authored by Noriko Ogiwara. It was published by Chuokoron-Shinsha. It was licensed for English language release in North America by Tokyopop.

Manga 
 Origine : Japan
 Type : Shōnen
 Author : Noriko Ogiwara
 Artist : Haruhiko Momokawa
 Publishers : : Mag Garden in Japan, Tokyopop in USA, and Kami in France
 Prepublished as : Comic Blade
 First volume release : July 9, 2004
 Number of volumes : 7 (last volume never released in English)

Anime 
An anime adaptation of The Good Witch of the West, directed by Katsuichi Nakayama and animated by Hal Film Maker,  was aired in Japan between April 8, 2006 and July 1, 2006 containing thirteen episodes. The anime was aired on KBS Kyoto, AT-X, BS Asahi, Gunma TV, Tokyo MX, and TVK. The regular and limited edition of the DVDs were released from July 7, 2006 to January 25, 2007 on the same day, totaling a set of 7.

The series uses two pieces of theme music. "Starry Waltz", performed by Kukui is used for the opening theme of all episodes. , sung by Mariaria, is used for the ending theme.

At its September release slate, Section23 Films announced that Maiden Japan will release the series in North America.

Soundtrack
The original soundtrack for the anime adaptation, composed by Masumi Itō, was released in Japan by Geneon Entertainment on July 26, 2006. It contains 39 tracks.

References

External links 

  (Japanese)
 TVアニメーション 西の善き魔女 Official Website (Japanese)
 Anything Asian Nishi No Yoki Majo anime page
 

2004 novels
Japanese fantasy novels
Japanese children's novels
Series of children's books
Chuokoron-Shinsha books
Anime and manga based on light novels
2004 manga
Shōnen manga
Mag Garden manga
Maiden Japan
Tokyopop titles
Television shows based on light novels
Tokyo MX original programming
2006 Japanese television series endings
Hal Film Maker
2004 children's books